Jóanes Nielsen (born April 5, 1953 in Tórshavn) is a Faroese author and poet of the 1980s generation.

Nielsen has written short stories, plays and novels. He has published seven collections of poetry, and was nominated for the Nordic Council's Literature Prize for the fourth time with his latest collection of poems, entitled Brúgvar av svongum orðum (Bridges of Hungry Words). One of his main influences is the writer William Heinesen, who features in some of his poems.

As a writer Nielsen is mainly associated with a political and often existential message. He has been nominated for the Nordic Council's Literature Prize five times: 1988, 1994, 1999, 2004 and 2012.

In December 2012 the international publication house Random House made a contract with Nielsen to publish his novel Brahmadellarnir, which was first to be published in German. The Random House contract was regarded as an historic event for Faroese literature, because no other Faroese author's work had until then been published by such a large publishing house.

Published work

 1978: Trettandi mánaðin (poems).
 1984: Pinnabrenni til sosialismuna (poems).
 1985: Tjøraðu plankarnir stevna inn í dreymin (poems).
 1986: Á landamørkum vaksa blomstur (short stories).
 1987: Naglar í jarðarinnar hús (poems). 
 1991: Gummistivlarnir eru tær einastu tempulsúlurnar sum vit eiga í Føroyum (novel).
 1993: Kirkjurnar á havsins botni (poems).
 1994: Undergroundting (essays, articles).
 1999: Undergroundting 2 (essays) 
 1998: Pentur (poems)
 1999: Undergroundting 2 (essays).
 2002: Eitur nakað land week-end? (play)
 2005: Glansbílætasamlararnir (novel).
 2007: Tey eru, sum taka mánalýsi í álvara (poems).
 2009: Aftaná undrið (play)
 2011: Brahmadellarnir (novel)
 2012: Tapet millum øldir (poems)

Translated into Danish 
 2016 – Tapet mellem århundreder (poetry) (May 2016) 
 2012 – Brahmadellerne – en nordatlantisk krønike (novel) (October 2012) 
 2011 – Der findes dem der tager måneskin alvorligt (poetry) 
 2010 – Broer af sultne ord (poetry) 
 2008 – Glansbilledsamlerne (novel) 
 2005 – Hedder noget land weekend? : skuespil i syv afsnit (play) 
 1999 – Sting (poems) 
 1994 – Kirkerne på havets bund (poetry) 
 1992 – Gummistøvlerne er de eneste tempelsøjler vi ejer på Færøerne (novel) 
 1988 – Saltet i dampende middagsgryder (poetry)

Translated into Norwegian 
 2009 – Glansbildesamlarane (roman) 
 2008 – Det fins dei som tar månelys på alvor (digte) 
 2007 – Frå alle kantar ber vinden med seg ord og plantar og teikn (digte i udvalg) 
 2004 – Bruer av svoltne ord (digte) 
 2003 – Sting (digte)

Translated into German 
 Contributed to the first ever Faroese/German anthology “From Janus Djurhuus to Tóroddur Poulsen – Faroese Poetry during 100 Years”, academic advice: Turið Sigurðardóttir, lineartranslation: Inga Meincke (2007), edited by Paul Alfred Kleinert.
 2016 - Die Erinnerungen (novel) (orig. Brahmadellarnir), translated from Danish by Ulrich Sonnenberg, btb Verlag (Randomhouse)

Honour 

1984 – Faroese Literature Prize (Mentanarvirðisløn M. A. Jacobsens)
2002 – Winner of the Nordic Drama Award for Eitur nakað land week-end ?.
 2011 – Mentanarvirðisløn Landsins (Faroese Cultural Award) (150.000 DKK)
 2012 – Faroese Literature Prize (Mentanarvirðisløn M. A. Jacobsens) for his novel Brahmadellarnir from 2011 (35.000 DKK).
2012 - Brahmadellarnir was nominated for the Nordic Council's Literature Prize 2013
2012 - He was the first Faroese author to make a contract with one of the world's largest publication houses, Random House.

References 

 nordic-literature.org
 Traces Grow Out Of Words - a film portrait of Jóanes Nielsen

1953 births
Living people
Faroese male novelists
20th-century Faroese poets
Faroese-language poets
Faroese short story writers
Faroese Literature Prize recipients
21st-century Faroese poets
Faroese male poets
20th-century Danish short story writers
21st-century Danish short story writers
Danish male short story writers
20th-century Danish male writers
21st-century Danish male writers